Assyabaab Bangil is an Indonesian football club based in Pasuruan Regency, East Java. They are competing in Liga 3 and their homeground is Pogar Bangil Stadium.

History
With a distinctive Arabic name, Assyabaab is indeed a club that was also founded by Arabs. But not by Arabs who are far from the Middle East, but people of Arab descent who live in Surabaya, Assyabaab was officially founded, with the name at that time was An Nasher or literally means The victory.

Initially founded by Yislam Murtak, Salim Barmen, Mohammad bin Said Martak, and Mohammad Bahalmar, This club is only a sports association whose purpose is to show the existence of people of Arab descent, as well as a place for them to exercise. It is not surprising then that it is not only football, but also pencak silat and volleyball, In 1932, the club then joined NIVB (Nederlandsch Indische Voetbal Bond) or the football federation in the Dutch East Indies (now Indonesia) so that they could participate in the internal competition of the Surabaya Football Federation, SVB (Soerabhaiasche Voetbal Bond).

On June 16, 1948, a major change occurred. Initiated by Zein bin Agil, Aly Bahalwan, Mochtar, and Ali Salim, the name Al Faouz was finally changed again, to Assyabaab which means Youth. A name that continues to this day, With an Arabic name, in 1964, there was a discourse to change the name to Putra Indonesia. However, the discourse received opposition from a number of internal administrators, eventually ending after being mediated by the then Minister of Sports, Maladi. Which suggested that the name Assyabaab remain in use. As there were also several other clubs in Indonesia that had Arabic names at that time such as Al Badar, Hizbul Wathon, and Al Hilal.

Assyaabaab's achievements and contributions to the Indonesian football scene include the editions of 1–5 September 1975, 6 February 1976, and 31 October 1981, In addition to participating in Galatama and having won the 1990 Galatama Division 1, Assyabab has also participated in the 1991 Bentoel Cup, 1991 Tugu Muda Cup, 1993 Kasogi Cup, and 1993 Indocement Cup.

In 1997, when the economic crisis hit Indonesia, the club's main sponsor got into trouble and eventually Assyabaab Salim Group disbanded. As the strongest team in Surabaya, even though the group is gone, Assyabaab as an amateur team is still there. Mohammad Barmen is still listed as the coach.

In the 2009-2010 season, Assyabaab was runner-up in the Persebaya Surabaya internal competition and was involved in a conflict with the Suryanaga club who won. Since then the division of Persebaya's internal clubs has occurred and the problem has become complicated. The news about Assyabaab is slowly fading away. Now news about the club, sometimes still found in several newspapers based in Surabaya.

Name history
 An-Nasher (1930–43)
 Al-Faouz (1943–48)
 Assyabaab (1948–91)
 Assyabaab Salim Group (1991–97)
 Assyabaab Bangil (2020–now)

Honours 
 1990 : Champion at "Divisi satu" or second level in Galatama
 1991–1992 : 13th place at Galatama
 1992–1993 : unknown position at Galatama
 1993–1994 : 3rd place in East group at Galatama
 1994–1995 : Quarter final at Liga Indonesia Premier Division
 1995–1996 : 9th place in East group at Liga Indonesia Premier Division
 1996–1997 : 10th place in East group at Liga Indonesia Premier Division
 2021 : 4th place in group K at Liga 3 East Java zone

References

External links
 

Football clubs in Indonesia
Association football clubs established in 1948
1948 establishments in Indonesia
Football clubs in East Java